Crocchè  (from the French croquettes) are a dish of Neapolitan and Sicilian origin, made from mashed potato and egg, which is covered in bread crumbs and fried.

Crocchè are typically a Southern Italian street food, ubiquitous at friggitorie specializing in fried foods, the Italian equivalent of Fish and chip shops.

See also
Arancini
Croquette
List of potato dishes
Panelle
Supplì

External links
A feature about a Palermitan friggitoria 

Cuisine of Sicily
Potato dishes
Neapolitan cuisine
Deep fried foods